Regent's Canal is a canal across an area just north of central London, England.

History 

First proposed by Thomas Homer in 1802 as a link from the Paddington arm of the then Grand Junction Canal (opened in 1801) with the River Thames at Limehouse, the Regent's Canal was built during the early 19th century after an Act of Parliament was passed in 1812. Noted architect and town planner John Nash was a director of the company; in 1811 he had produced a masterplan for George IV, then Prince Regent, to redevelop a large area of central north London – as a result, the Regent's Canal was included in the scheme, running for part of its distance along the northern edge of Regent's Park. 

As with many Nash projects, the detailed design was passed to one of his assistants, in this case James Morgan, who was appointed chief engineer of the canal company. Work began on 14 October 1812. Various intermediate basins were also constructed (e.g.: Cumberland Basin to the east of Regent's Park, Battlebridge Basin (close to King's Cross, London) and City Road Basin). Many other basins such as Wenlock Basin, Kingsland Basin, St. Pancras Stone and Coal Basin, and one in front of the Great Northern Railway's Granary were also built, and some of these survive.

All the locks were built with duplicate chambers to facilitate the heavy barge traffic.  With the demise of commercial traffic in the early 1970s, at the end of 1973, the British Waterways Board embarked on a three-year programme to convert one chamber at each lock into an overflow weir to facilitate unmanned use by pleasure craft without the risk of serious flooding due to incorrect use of the paddles.

The City Road Basin, the nearest to the City of London, soon eclipsed the Paddington Basin in the amount of goods carried, principally coal and building materials. These were goods that were being shipped locally, in contrast to the canal's original purpose of transshipping imports to the Midlands. The opening of the London and Birmingham Railway in 1838 actually increased the tonnage of coal carried by the canal. By the early twentieth century, with the Midland trade lost to the railways, and more deliveries made by road, the canal had fallen into a long decline.

Explosion of the barge Tilbury under the Macclesfield Bridge

Just before 5am on 2 October 1874 the narrowboat barge Tilbury which was loaded with sugar, nuts, three barrels of petroleum and around five tons of gunpowder exploded right under the Macclesfield Bridge, just outside London Zoo.
Until the explosion, the Tilbury was part of a convoy consisting of a tugboat and three narrowboats travelling westwards heading for a quarry in the West Midlands.

Damage and aftermath
All the people on board died; captain Charles Baxton, a labourer named William Taylor, a third man and a young boy. The Macclesfield bridge was destroyed and rebuilt in 1876 reusing the cast iron pillars (made in Coalbrookdale according to an inscription at their top), but turning them by 180° (canal side towards tow path side) so tow rope grooves that were created before the incident can be seen on the outer side of the columns.

The explosion was heard 20 miles away. Debris flew in all directions, the roofs of surrounding houses blew off, windows smashed, trees uprooted and dead fish rained down on the West End. The tugboat's keel was found embedded in a house 300 yards away. The bridge was nick-named the 'Blow-Up Bridge'.

The damage would have been far worse had the barge exploded in the highly populated areas of Camden and Islington, which the convoy had passed through earlier that morning.
The canal company that owned Tilbury was condemned for gross negligence in permitting the “highly imprudent and improper” practice of carrying petroleum and gunpowder aboard the same barge.
The incident accelerated the passing of the Explosives Act in 1875, which regulates the manufacture and carriage of dangerous substances.

Railway projects
There were a number of abortive projects to convert the route of the canal into a railway. In September 1845 a special general assembly of the proprietors approved the sale of the canal at the price of one million pounds to a group of businessmen who had formed the Regent's Canal Railway Company for the purpose. The advertisement for the company explained: The vast importance of this undertaking, whereby a junction will be effected between all existing and projected railways north of the Thames, combined with the advantage of a General City Terminus, is too obvious to require comment.
By the proposed railway, passengers and goods will be brought into the heart of the City at a great saving of time and expense, and facilities will be afforded for the more expeditious transmission of the mails to most parts of the kingdom. 

The railway company subsequently failed, but in 1846 the directors of the canal went about trying to obtain an Act of Parliament to allow them to build a railway along its banks. The scheme was abandoned in the face of vigorous opposition, especially from the government who objected to the idea of a railway passing through Regent's Park. In 1859, two further schemes to convert the canal into a railway were proposed. One, from a company called the Central London Railway and Dock Company, was accepted by the directors, but once again the railway company failed. In 1860 the Regent's Canal Company proposed a railway track alongside the canal from Kings Cross to Limehouse, but funds could not be raised. Further schemes over the next twenty years also came to nothing, with the Metropolitan Railway that opened to the south in 1863 serving much the same purpose of linking the lines radiating north of London.

In 1883, after some years of negotiation, the canal was sold to a company called the Regent's Canal and City Docks Railway Company. at a cost of £1,170,585. The company altered its name to the North Metropolitan Railway and Canal Company in 1892, but no railway was ever built; instead it raised money for dock and canal improvement and eventually, in 1904, became the Regent's Canal and Dock Company.

The Regent's Canal and Dock Company became part of the merged Grand Union Canal Company on 1 January 1929.

New uses

A new purpose was found for the canal route in 1979, when the Central Electricity Generating Board (CEGB) installed underground cables in a trough below the towpath between St John's Wood and City Road. These 400 kV cables now form part of the National Grid, supplying electrical power to London. Pumped canal water is circulated as a coolant for the high-voltage cables. The canal is frequently used today for pleasure cruising; a regular waterbus service operates between Maida Vale and Camden, running hourly during the summer months.

Due to the increase in cycle commuting since the 2005 London Bombings and increasing environmental awareness, the canal's towpath has become a busy cycle route for commuters. National Cycle Route 1 includes the stretch along the canal towpath from Limehouse Basin to Mile End. British Waterways has carried out several studies into the effects of sharing the towpath between cyclists and pedestrians, all of which have concluded that despite the limited width there were relatively few problems at the time of the audits. More recently, in 2019, The Guardian reported on instances of conflict between pedestrians and cyclists.

Geography 
The Regent's Canal forms a junction with the old Grand Junction Canal at Little Venice, a short distance north of Paddington Basin. After passing through the Maida Hill and Lisson Grove tunnels, the canal curves round the northern edge of Regent's Park, passing London Zoo and skirting round the base of Primrose Hill. It continues through Camden Town and King's Cross Central. It performs a sharp bend at Camley Street Natural Park, following Goods Way where it flows behind both St Pancras railway station and King's Cross railway station. The canal opens out into Battlebridge Basin, originally known as Horsfall Basin, home of the London Canal Museum. Continuing eastwards beyond the Islington tunnel it forms the southern end of Broadway Market and meets the Hertford Union Canal at Victoria Park, East London. It turns south towards the Limehouse Basin, where it meets the Limehouse Cut, and ends as it joins the River Thames.

Maximum craft dimensions

The navigational depth is, on average 1.15 m (3 ft 6 in).

Culture
In 2012, playwright Rob Inglis was awarded a £16,000 Arts Council grant to write Regent's Canal, a Folk Opera, a musical that celebrates the 200th anniversary of the digging of the canal. It played in a number of locations around London in 2012.

See also 
 St Pancras Cruising Club
 Camden Lock
 Kingsland Basin
 List of canal basins in Great Britain
 List of canal aqueducts in Great Britain
 List of canal locks in Great Britain
 List of canal tunnels in Great Britain

References

Further reading 
 Alan Faulkner – The Regent's Canal: London's Hidden Waterway (2005) 
 Alan Faulkner – The George and the Mary: A Brief History of the Grand Union Canal carrying Company Ltd (1973)

External links 
 
 Canalplan AC Gazetteer: Grand Union Canal (Regent's Canal)
 Plan of Grand Union Canal (Regent's Canal) with links to places of interest near each lock, basin, and bridge.
 Photographs of Regent's Canal
 Regent's Canal interactive map
 More background information and history of the Regent's Arm
 Regent's Canal, Camden markets, history and pictures
 Regent's Canal Walk: Little Venice to Limehouse Basin (Walking Guide)

 
CRegents
Port of London
Canals opened in 1820
1820 establishments in England